Karoline is a given name. Notable people with the name include:

Karoline Amaral (born 1984), model
Karoline Bjørnson (1835–1934), Norwegian actress
Karoline Bruch-Sinn (1853–1911), Austrian writer
Karoline Dyhre Breivang (born 1980), Norwegian team handball player
Karoline Hausted, Danish pianist and songwriter
Karoline Herfurth (born 1984), German actress
Karoline Jagemann (1777–1848), major German tragic actress and singer
Karoline Käfer (born 1954), retired sprinter from Austria
Karoline Kaulla (1739–1809), one of the greatest Court Jews of her time
Karoline Krüger, Norwegian singer-songwriter and pianist
Karoline Leach (born 1967), British playwright and author
Karoline Linnert (born 1958), German politician of the Alliance 90/The Greens
Karoline Nemetz (born 1958), Swedish former distance runner
Karoline Pichler (1769–1843), Austrian novelist
Karoline Seidler-Wranitzky (1790–1872), Czech operatic soprano
Karoline von Günderrode (1780–1806), German poet, born in Karlsruhe
Karoline von Manderscheid-Blankenheim (1768–1831), princess consort of Liechtenstein

See also

Archduchess Karoline Marie of Austria (1869–1945), member of the House of Habsburg-Lorraine
Countess Karoline Ernestine of Erbach-Schönberg (born 1727), daughter of Georg August, Count of Erbach-Schönberg
Landgravine Karoline Amalie of Hesse-Kassel (1771–1848), German princess member of the House of Hesse-Kassel
Marie Karoline von Fuchs-Mollard (1681–1754), governess of Maria Theresa of Austria
Princess Karoline Mathilde of Schleswig-Holstein-Sonderburg-Augustenburg (1860–1932), the second-eldest daughter of Frederick VIII
Princess Karoline Mathilde of Schleswig-Holstein-Sonderburg-Glücksburg (1894–1972), member of the House of Schleswig-Holstein-Sonderburg-Glücksburg
Tove Karoline Knutsen (born 1951), Norwegian politician for the Labour Party
Karolina (name)
Karline
Karolien
Karolin (name)

de:Caroline (Vorname)
eo:Karoline
sv:Karoline